Rudolph Zerses Gill (or Ruolph Zerse Gill, RZ Gill and Doll Gill; 1866–1951) was an American architect and builder of the classical revival style that has designed several municipal buildings, club halls, and private residences in Illinois, Missouri, Kentucky and Tennessee.  A few have been nominated to the National Register of Historic Places (NRHP). 

R.Z. Gill graduated with a degree in architecture from the University of Illinois in 1887. 

Works include:
the Lindley House (1895), Urbana, Illinois
the Franklin County Jail (1905–06), Benton, Illinois,
the Murphysboro Elks Lodge (1916), Murphysboro, Illinois, NRHP-listed
the Barth and Walker Building (1916), Murphysboro, Illinois,
the West Frankfort Elks Lodge (1923) West Frankfort, IL
the VanCloostere Building (1925), Murphysboro, Illinois,
the Mount Zion Lodge Masonic Temple (1933), West Plains, Missouri, NRHP-listed 
the Riverside Park Bandshell (1939), Murphysboro, Illinois, NRHP-listed.

References 

1866 births
1951 deaths
20th-century American architects
19th-century American architects
Architects from Illinois
People from Urbana, Illinois
People from Murphysboro, Illinois